NGC 1974 (also known as NGC 1991 and ESO 85-SC89) is an open cluster associated with an emission nebula which is located in the Dorado constellation which is part of the Large Magellanic Cloud. It was discovered by James Dunlop on November 6, 1826 and later observed by John Herschel on January 2, 1837, subsequently cataloged as NGC 1991. Its apparent magnitude is 9.0 and its size is 1.7 arc minutes.

References

External links
 

Open clusters
1974
ESO objects
Dorado (constellation)
Large Magellanic Cloud
Astronomical objects discovered in 1826
Discoveries by James Dunlop